Tallabogue is a stream in the U.S. state of Mississippi. It is a tributary to Tuscolameta Creek.

Tallabogue is a name derived from the Choctaw language purported to mean "palmetto creek". Variant names are "Taalah Creek" and "Tallabogue Creek".

References

Rivers of Mississippi
Rivers of Scott County, Mississippi
Mississippi placenames of Native American origin